The Kelso Site, near Mullen in Hooker County, Nebraska, was listed on the National Register of Historic Places in 1974.

It was the site of a prehistoric village.  The archeological site is designated by Smithsonian trinomial of 25 HO 23.

According to Nebraska History: "Kelso is located on a sand dune overlooking the Middle Loup River near the town of Mullen. It is important as a rare example of a little known Woodland culture of the Sand Hills, Panhandle, and eastern Colorado dating A.D. 500-1100."

The archeological site was partially excavated in 1947, when the proposed Mullen Reservoir project was planned.  This was "the only major excavation of a Woodland site in the Sand Hills proper. Approximately one-quarter of the Kelso site was excavated. Two hearths were uncovered, but storage pits or architectural ruins were not located. Artifacts included pottery, stone tools, animal remains, and a bone awl. The animal bone sample reflected an emphasis on smaller game. The site is somewhere between 950 and 1,350 years old."

See also
Humphrey Archeological Site

References

National Register of Historic Places in Nebraska
Archaeological sites in Nebraska
Buildings and structures in Hooker County, Nebraska